Loyal B. Stearns (May 2, 1853 – June 2, 1936) was an American politician, attorney, and jurist in Oregon. Born in New Hampshire and raised in Oregon, he became a lawyer and practiced in Portland. A Republican, he was a member of the Oregon House of Representatives and later a judge for several courts.

Early life
Loyal Stearns was born to Daniel W. Stearns and Almira Stearns (nee Fay) on May 2, 1853. One of five children, he was born in Swanzey, New Hampshire, and sailed with his family that year via the Isthmus of Panama route to San Francisco, California. In 1854, they continued north to the Oregon Territory. There they settled in Southern Oregon in Scottsburg. The younger Stearns was educated in Roseburg at the local schools and at Umpqua Academy. He also traveled around the state and into Idaho while working with his merchant father.

In 1871, Stearns relocated north to Portland where he attended Bishop Scott Academy until 1872. Stearns then enrolled at the Willamette University College of Medicine in Salem, Oregon, for one term before leaving to study law. He read law under the guidance of A. C. Gibbs and William Ball Gilbert at their law firm in Portland beginning in 1873. In December 1876, he passed the bar and began practicing law in Portland. Stearns started as a partner of Gibbs before practicing on his own.

Political career
Stearns was elected to the Oregon House of Representatives in 1878 as a Republican. He represented District 38 which at that time was located entirely within Multnomah County, and included Portland. His father Daniel Stearns served in the House previously, and then served in the state senate following Loyal's one session in the Oregon Legislative Assembly. Loyal Stearns then served as Portland’s police judge from January 1879 to 1882 followed by election to the office of city attorney. After a short time in that position, he was elected to a seat on Multnomah County’s court, and served from June 1882 to 1885. In 1885, he became a judge for the Oregon circuit court where he remained until 1898. Governor Zenas Ferry Moody appointed him to the position, and Stearns won election to a full-term and then re-election until retiring from the bench.

Later years and family
On June 19, 1883, he married Mary Frances Hoyt, and they had one daughter together. Stearns worked in the real estate business following his judicial career. Mary, the daughter of Captain Richard Hoyt, died in 1933. Loyal Stearns died on June 2, 1936, at the age of 83.

See also
 Loyal B. Stearns Memorial Fountain (1941)

References

External links
Loyal B. Stearns Memorial Fountain
The Bench and Bar
Picture of Stearns
 The Story of Oregon

Members of the Oregon House of Representatives
1853 births
1936 deaths
Portland, Oregon Republicans
Oregon state court judges
Politicians from Roseburg, Oregon
Willamette University alumni
American lawyers admitted to the practice of law by reading law
Oregon city attorneys
People from Cheshire County, New Hampshire
People from Scottsburg, Oregon
Willamette University College of Medicine alumni